Phaecadophora is a genus of moths belonging to the subfamily Olethreutinae of the family Tortricidae.

Species
Phaecadophora acutana Walsingham, 1900
Phaecadophora fimbriata Walsingham, 1900

See also
List of Tortricidae genera

References

External links
tortricidae.com

Olethreutini
Tortricidae genera
Taxa named by Thomas de Grey, 6th Baron Walsingham